The cuisine of Christmas Island can best be described as an eclectic combination of traditional Australian cuisine and Asian cuisine, particularly meals from Malaysia and Indonesia.

Population
, the island had just 1,200 residents - 65% Chinese Malaysians 20% Malaysian Malays and 15% of residents are of European descent. There are also small Malaysian Indian and Eurasian communities on the island. 

Previously an additional 2,000+ people lived at the Christmas Island Immigration Reception and Processing Centre. Their meals were flown in by the Australian Government via operator Serco. The centre was closed in October 2018 but re-opened in 2019, and as of early 2020 hosted only one family of Tamil asylum seekers.

Food supply

Almost no fresh food is grown on the island due to nematodes in the soil. However, there are three local gardens on the island that grow small amounts of Asian greens. There is a community garden at Drumsite, another small community vegetable patch in Poon Saan and a temple garden also in Poon Saan. These community gardens are distinctive for their garden beds built up out of the soil, as the worms tend not to come up towards the heat and risk drying out, preserving the roots of the vegetables. Some of the Asian greens and vegetables grown include bok choy, choy sum, kangkong, Chinese mustard, eggplant and okra among others.

Locals rely on government-contracted deliveries of fresh food from mainland Australia.  there is an additional air-freight of vegetables that arrives from Malaysia via Indonesia each Friday night for purchase on Saturday morning. This air-freight caters mostly to the tastes of the local community bringing in fresh noodles, Asian greens, fish, pork belly, bones and fillets, and other package foods like fish balls and tofu.

In recent years, the supply of fresh food has been affected by a number of major incidents. In January 2012, the MV Tycoon crashed into the island's main dock at Flying Fish Cove, preventing subsequent fresh-food deliveries from reaching the island. When food supplies by ship are not available, air-freighted deliveries have been known to sell out within hours.

Wild food

Due to the tropical nature of Christmas Island's weather, a wide variety of food grows wild on the island. Fruit trees are found dotted around the island and on private properties. Some of the things that can be found by foraging on Christmas Island include:

 papaya
 mango
 coconut
 pumpkin
 chilli
 jackfruit
 wild lime
 bunga kantan (also known as laksa flower or torch ginger flower - botanical name Etlingera elatior)
 manquang (a Chinese turnip also known as jicama)
 tapioca
 lemongrass
 banana
 guava

Many other well known tropical fruits such as rambutan, lychee and durian do not grow on Christmas Island as there is inadequate soil depth and not enough steady rainfall throughout the year.

Meals

As a result of supply issues, whole fresh produce can be difficult to acquire and so meals that make use of processed foods and canned foods are popular.

Traditionally, chickens were kept on the island and locals produced their own pickled eggs and Chinese century eggs. Dishes that made use of the chickens themselves were popular along with dishes that included local coconut crabs. However, coconut crabs are now a protected species.

Places to eat out

The island has a number of noodle bars offering Chinese and Malaysian dishes in accordance with the traditional cuisines of the island's residents.

There are 10 places to eat out on Christmas Island

 Cari Makan - a Malay cafe at Kampong - different specials each night of the week
 Le CLA (Chinese Literary Association) - a Chinese restaurant at Settlement
 The Barracks Cafe - an Australian cafe at Settlement
 The Golden Bosun - an Australian style pub
 The Christmas Island Resort - a restaurant selling a variety of Western and Asian food.
 Tracks Tavern - a pub at Drumsite that sells burgers and Thai Food
 Lucky Ho - a local Chinese Restaurant at Poon Saan
 Seaview Fish and Chips - a local "chippie" in Poon Saan
 Seasons Palace - another local Chinese Restaurant in Poon Saan
 The Coffee Shop (also known as Poon Saan Kopi Tiam) which sells a different Malaysian hawker dish special each day.

See also

 Malaysian cuisine
 Chinese cuisine

References

 
Southeast Asian cuisine